Charles Anthony Mooney (January 5, 1879 – May 29, 1931) was a five-term U.S. Representative from Ohio.

Biography
Born in St. Marys, Auglaize County, Ohio, Mooney attended public and Jesuit schools. He was graduated from St. Marys High School in 1895 and then engaged in the local life insurance business. He moved to Cleveland, Ohio, in 1910 and continued the life insurance business.

Political career 
He served as a member of the Ohio Senate from 1915 to 1919.

Mooney was elected as a Democrat to the Sixty-sixth Congress (March 4, 1919 – March 3, 1921). He was an unsuccessful candidate for reelection in 1920 to the Sixty-seventh Congress. He served as a delegate to the Democratic National Conventions in 1920, 1924, and 1928.

Mooney was elected to the Sixty-eighth and to the four succeeding Congresses and served from March 4, 1923.

Death
He died in Cleveland, Ohio, on May 29, 1931.

He was interred in Gethsemane Cemetery, St. Marys, Ohio.

See also
List of United States Congress members who died in office (1900–49)

Sources

1879 births
1931 deaths
People from St. Mary's, Ohio
Politicians from Cleveland
Democratic Party Ohio state senators
Democratic Party members of the United States House of Representatives from Ohio